Park Se-Bin (born October 23, 2000) is a South Korean figure skater.

Career

2015-2016
Park competed at the JGP Qualification competition held in South Korea and placed 7th place with total score 136.80, so she was given a spot for the JGP series. She placed 7th with total score 131.55 at her first ISU competition.

Programs

Competitive highlights

2011–present

References

 

2000 births
Living people
South Korean female single skaters
Figure skaters from Seoul